Luca Marseiler (born 18 February 1997) is a German professional footballer who plays as a midfielder for  club Viktoria Köln.

Career
Marseiler played for SpVgg Unterhaching's reserve team during the 2014–15 season where he scored one goal in ten appearances. He then joined the first team during the 2015–16 season where he scored one goal in 25 competitive appearances. He continued playing for Unterhaching during the 2016–17 season where he scored a goal in 19 competitive matches. Marseiler made his 2017–18 season debut on matchday 23 against Fortuna Köln.

On 14 June 2022, Marseiler moved to Viktoria Köln on a permanent basis after playing for the club on loan in the previous season.

Career statistics

References

External links
 

1997 births
Living people
Footballers from Munich
German footballers
German people of Italian descent
Association football midfielders
SpVgg Unterhaching players
SpVgg Unterhaching II players
SC Paderborn 07 players
FC Viktoria Köln players
3. Liga players
Regionalliga players
Oberliga (football) players